The striated laughingthrush (Grammatoptila striatus) is a passerine bird in the family Leiothrichidae. It was at one time placed in the genus Garrulax but following the publication of a comprehensive molecular phylogenetic study in 2018, it was moved to be the only species in the resurrected genus Grammatoptila.

It is found in the northern temperate regions of the Indian subcontinent and ranges across Bhutan, India, Myanmar, Tibet and Nepal. Its natural habitats are subtropical or tropical moist lowland forests and subtropical or tropical moist montane forests.

References

striated laughingthrush
Birds of North India
Birds of Nepal
Birds of Eastern Himalaya
striated laughingthrush
Taxonomy articles created by Polbot
Taxobox binomials not recognized by IUCN